St Fagans Castle is an Elizabethan mansion in St Fagans, Cardiff, Wales, dating from the late 16th century. The house and remaining medieval fortifications are Grade I listed. The grounds of St Fagans Castle now contain St Fagans National Museum of History. The castle estate is designated Grade I on the Cadw/ICOMOS Register of Parks and Gardens of Special Historic Interest in Wales.

History
A medieval castle dating from the 13th century previously existed on the site. By 1536 it lay in ruins. By 1563 the site had been sold to a Dr John Gibbon. A new house was built on the site either by Gibbon or by Nicholas Herbert, who bought the site from Gibbon in 1586. Part of the D-shaped medieval boundary fortifications remain, forming a wall around the current house.

Sir Edward Lewis of The Van, Caerphilly, bought the house in 1616 and the interior dates partly from then and partly from after 1850, when it began use as the preferred summer home of the senior branch of the Windsor-Clive family. These were from 1905 elevated to the Earldom of Plymouth.  Their (Lord Windsor) ownership arose in 1833, namely since its passing to Lady Harriet Clive, wife of the 13th Lord Windsor.  She then had carried out decades of restorations. The sequence of terraces in the gardens was created for the Windsor-Clives in 1865–6 and extended in the early 20th century. The house became a convalescent hospital for soldiers during World War I, with the banqueting hall containing a ward of 40 beds.

In 1947 the family gave the estate to the National Museum of Wales.

Building alongside and grounds accommodate the former Welsh Folk Museum, St Fagans National Museum of History.

The castle is statutorily recognised and protected in the highest category (Grade I) since 1977. The lead water cistern in the courtyard is Grade II* listed, Many garden structures have initial, mainstream Grade II status.

Gallery

References

External links

 St Fagans Castle and Gardens, St Fagans National Museum of History

Castles in Cardiff
Castle ruins in Wales
Historic house museums in Wales
Country houses in Wales
Grade I listed buildings in Cardiff
St Fagans National Museum of History
castle
Registered historic parks and gardens in Cardiff